Xaa-Pro aminopeptidase (X-Pro aminopeptidase, proline aminopeptidase, aminopeptidase P, aminoacylproline aminopeptidase) is an enzyme. This enzyme catalyses the following chemical reaction

 Release of any N-terminal amino acid, including proline, that is linked to proline, even from a dipeptide or tripeptide

This enzyme is Mn2+-dependent.

References

External links 
 

EC 3.4.11